The Deplorable Word, as used by author C. S. Lewis in The Chronicles of Narnia, is a fictional magical curse which ends all life on a world except that of the one who speaks it.

Background
In The Magician's Nephew,  the children who are the central characters, Digory Kirke and Polly Plummer, come to a lifeless world called Charn.   In an ancient, ruined building they awaken a queen called Jadis. She tells them of a worldwide civil war she fought against her sister. All of Jadis's armies were defeated, having been made to fight to the death of the last soldier, and her sister claimed victory. Then Jadis spoke the horrible curse which her sister knew she had discovered but did not think she would use. In speaking the Deplorable Word, Jadis killed every living thing in her world, except herself, to avoid losing the war to her sister.

The children are shocked by this account, but Jadis has no remorse or pity for all the ordinary people whom she killed; in her eyes, they existed only for her to use. The past rulers of her race, who evidently had not always been evil, knew of the Deplorable Word's existence but not the word itself, and had vowed that none of them, nor their descendants, would seek to discover it. Jadis said she had “learned it in a secret place and paid a terrible price to learn it".

Lewis did not say what the word was, or the price paid to learn it.

Meaning
The book was written in 1955 during the Cold War, ten years after the first atomic weapons were dropped on Hiroshima and Nagasaki, Japan, and three years after the hydrogen bomb was first detonated.  Lewis does not explicitly link the Deplorable Word to any specific weapon of mass destruction, but he alludes to the power of humanity to destroy life. Near the end of the story Lewis has the lion Aslan say to the central characters from the Victorian era:

Several writers have interpreted this warning as an allusion to atomic weapons.

References 

Fiction about curses
The Chronicles of Narnia
Weapons of mass destruction in fiction